Bekir Yılmaz (born 6 March 1988) is a Turkish professional footballer who plays as a midfielder for Boluspor.

Club career
Yılmaz began his career with loca club Buca Belediye in 2000. He was transferred to Bucaspor in 2006, before transferring to Manisaspor in 2010.

References

External links

1988 births
Living people
Turkish footballers
Bucaspor footballers
Manisaspor footballers
Bursaspor footballers
Adanaspor footballers
Gençlerbirliği S.K. footballers
Giresunspor footballers
Süper Lig players
TFF First League players
Footballers from İzmir
Association football midfielders